Hybris is a vertically scrolling shooter for the Amiga home computer developed by Cope-Com and published by Discovery Software.

Gameplay
Players choose a player character commander from either Lovett or Maverick and begin play, controlling a spaceship which can be moved up and down the screen, as well as left and right. Airborne alien enemies and groundbased defensive weapons appear as the game scrolls upwards constantly, these can be destroyed by the player's weapon fire. More advanced weapons can be collected in the form of power ups. Hybris has a weapon enhancement feature, called "expansion"; once a new weapon has been collected it can be temporarily upgraded by the player rotating the joystick or pressing "Enter" on the keyboard, each weapon can be enhanced three times before a new weapon is needed in order to enhance again. Pressing "Space" on the keyboard activates a smart bomb that destroy every enemy (except bosses) and bullet on the screen: player starts with three of them.

Legacy
Cope-Com later created the spiritual successor Battle Squadron.

The creators are working to port the game to Android and iOS.

References

1989 video games
Amiga games
Amiga-only games
Vertically scrolling shooters
Video games developed in Denmark